VOQ may refer to:

 Virtual output queueing
 Sierra Wireless Voq, a Smartphone
 Voice of Quellious, a fictional magical item in the video game EverQuest
 Visiting Officers Quarters (US military)
 Voq, a Klingon character later surgically altered into a Klingon-Human hybrid in Star Trek: Discovery.